The Furo Santa Rosa is a river of Roraima state in northern Brazil. It is an anabranch - a diversionary channel - of the Uraricoera River; together they bound the Ilha de Maracá.

See also
List of rivers of Roraima

References
Brazilian Ministry of Transport

Rivers of Roraima